is a railway station in Myōkō, Niigata, Japan, jointly operated by the third-sector railway operators Shinano Railway and Echigo Tokimeki Railway.

Lines
No regularly scheduled through-running services operate, but a cross-platform transfer is provided, with Shinano Railway trains normally using platform 2 and Echigo Tokimeki Railway trains normally using platform 3.

Station layout
The station has one side platform and one island platform connected by a footbridge.

Platforms

Adjacent stations

History

The station opened on 1 May 1888, named . It was renamed Myōkō-Kōgen Station on 1 October 1969. With the privatization of JNR on 1 April 1987, the station came under the control of East Japan Railway Company (JR East).

From this date, Myōkō-Kōgen Station became a boundary station between the Shinano Railway Kita-Shinano Line of Nagano Prefecture to the south and the Echigo Tokimeki Railway Myōkō Haneuma Line of Niigata Prefecture to the north.

Passenger statistics
In fiscal 2015, the station was used by an average of 282 passengers daily (boarding passengers only).

Surrounding area
 Former Myoko-Kogen town hall

See also
 List of railway stations in Japan

References

External links

 Shinano Railway station information 
 Echigo Tokimeki Railway Station information 
 Timetable for Myōkō-Kōgen Station 

Shin'etsu Main Line
Railway stations in Niigata Prefecture
Railway stations in Japan opened in 1888
Stations of Echigo Tokimeki Railway
Myōkō, Niigata